In the papal conclave held on 29 and 30 December 1370, after the death of Pope Urban V, Cardinal Pierre Roger de Beaufort was elected pope under the name Gregory XI. He thus became seventh and the last pope of the period of Avignon Papacy.

List of participants 

Urban V died on December 20, 1370, at Avignon. He was the first pope who resided in Rome since 1304, although only for a short time (1367 until the beginning of 1370, when he returned to Avignon). At the time of his death, there were 20 living cardinals. Eighteen of them participated in the conclave:

Nine electors were created by Pope Urban V, five by Clement VI and four by Innocent VI.

Post of the Camerlengo of the Holy Roman Church, the most important during sede vacante, was occupied by Arnaud Aubert, archbishop of Auch and nephew of Pope Innocent VI (but not a Cardinal).

Absentees 

Two Cardinals, both created by Urban V, did not participate in this conclave, because they were in Italy:

The election of Pope Gregory XI 

Eighteen cardinals present in Avignon entered the conclave on December 29. In the first ballot on the next day in the morning Cardinal Pierre Roger de Beaufort, nephew of Clement VI, protodeacon of the Sacred College, was unanimously elected Pope. He initially opposed his election but eventually accepted and took the name of Gregory XI. On January 2, 1371 he was ordained to the priesthood, and on January 3 he was consecrated bishop of Rome by the dean of the College of Cardinals Guy de Boulogne, and crowned by the new protodeacon Rinaldo Orsini in the cathedral Notre Dame des Doms in Avignon.

References

Sources 
 Salvador Miranda: list of participants of the papal conclave of 1370
 Pope Gregory XI
 G. Mollat, The Popes at Avignon 1305-1378, London 1963

1370
14th-century elections
1370
Avignon Papacy
14th-century Catholicism
14th century in Europe